Internet monitoring may refer to:

 Network monitoring, for failures in the network
 Real user monitoring, for threat detection
 Website monitoring, for failures in the servers
 Internet surveillance, for mass surveillance